The Our Lady of the Assumption Parish Church (Spanish: Iglesia Parroquial de Nuestra Señora de la Asunción), commonly known as Maragondon Church, is the only heritage structure in the municipality of Maragondon, Cavite, Philippines declared by the National Museum as a National Cultural Treasure.

History
Before 1611 Maragondon was established as a separate town from Silang by the Jesuit Angelo Armano. Before this year the Franciscans were already actively evangelizing the area. In 1630 a second church with more elaborate furnishings was completed. During this year hacienda in Looc, straddling the boundaries of Batangas and Cavite, bequeathed to the Jesuits’ Colegio de Manila, was added to Maragondon's jurisdiction. In 1633 a new and bigger church was built to replace the older and smaller one, the church stone for some time between 1646 and 1649. The government ordered its demolition for fear that the Dutch, who were at war with Spain, would use it and other churches near Manila for fortification. The orders were apparently implemented because on May 16, 1650, a license was given to the Jesuits to build a house and church of wood in Maragondon to replace the one that had been demolished.

Repairs were made on the convent between 1666 and 1672. In 1687 another church was begun although the construction was interrupted; only in 1714 was it completed. The church was repaired a number of times but data on the renovation are sketchy. After 1860 the Recollect added windows with colored glass panes, and set these in a wooded frame decorated with a quail on a plate, the attribute of San Nicolas de Tolentino. ”

The secular priest de los Reyes also did some repairs probably during the convocation of the second Vatican Council which was commemorated in the Philippines with a jubilee year. To commemorate the event, a roof beam was emblazoned with inscriptions. ”

[Additional data-note from a returning parishioner:  While the church is undoubtedly a Jesuit Church, it shows signs of previous care by the Franciscans.  Up the doorway to the sacristy is the image of St. Anthony of Padua and opposite or across it at the other side of the altar is St. Claire. By the way, notably till the 1950s, there were practicing devotees of the Third Order of Franciscans which devotion seems to  have disappeared with the death of the last Hermanos (Manong) and Hermanas (Manang).  Maybe, we can invite some Franciscans to come and revive such devotions. While in this topic of revival, The Sodality which is a part of our Jesuit devotions seems to be at best anemic.  Maybe, we can have a true revival of Marian Devotions by having The Sodality and the Legion of Mary working as one group as true Daughters/Servants of Mary.]

Architectural details
Maragondon is unique among Jesuit churches for its proportion. The façade is narrow but tall, not squatty as in other churches. To the left of the façade is the taller bell tower with no clear divisions between the stories. The bell tower has a quadrilateral shaft that tapers upward with four corners ending with finials.

In contrast to the simplicity of its façade is the ornate door, divided into boxes, with floral designs of different shapes and ships and castles carved on it. Both in and out, the church fabric made of river stones are covered with a layer of paletada (stucco).

The elevation found in the façade is emphasized in the interior by the use of pilasters that taper the upwards. This produces a dizzying effect, as the pillars appear to soar up and sway. The main roof beams are exposed and emblazoned with biblical and commemorative captions. The door leading from sanctuary to sacristy is also carved with flowers enclosed in boxes.

There are three church retables, all brightly polychromed. The image of the Assumption of Mary is placed in the main retable, in the main niche. An image of San Ignacio (St. Ignatius Loyola) to the left and an image of San Luis Gonzaga (St. Aloysius Gonzaga) to the right are also in the main retable. The main retable was decorated using  salomonica columns, foliage, and angels with trumpets.

Also polychromed in red, blue, gold, and green, is an octagonal pulpit, located at the right side of the church. Its panel decoration includes the names of Jesus and Mary in monograms. The bottom of the pulpit is decorated with swirling foliage that end in an inverted pineapple.

A cross, dated 1712, is found near the church's main entrance.  Part of the convent looks older than the rest. The older part is made of rubble while the newer part is cut stone brick. An elegant staircase of stone and tile are found in the older part.  A newer sacristy was added. There are remains of an old defensive wall and a blockhouse that surrounds the quadrangle formed by the church and convent.

Gallery

References

Notes

Bibliography
Jose, R. T., & Ayala Museum (1991). Simbahan: Church art in colonial Philippines, 1565–1898. Metro Manila, Philippines: Ayala Museum.
Cultural Center of the Philippines (1994). CCP Encyclopedia of Philippine Art: Volume III. Manila: Cultural Center of the Philippines.

Roman Catholic churches in Cavite
National Cultural Treasures of the Philippines
Marked Historical Structures of the Philippines
Spanish Colonial architecture in the Philippines
Baroque architecture in the Philippines
1581 establishments in the Philippines
Churches in the Roman Catholic Diocese of Imus